The National Security Advisor (NSA;) is the senior official on the National Security Council of India, and the chief advisor to the Prime Minister of India on national security policy and international affairs. In 2019, the term of Ajit Doval the current NSA was extended for another 5-year term, and has been asigned the rank of a Union Cabinet Minister and ranks at the seventh position in the Indian Order of Precedence.

History 
Brajesh Mishra, then Principal Secretary to the Prime Minister, was appointed as the first National Security Advisor of India. The post was created on 19 November 1998 by then government headed by Atal Bihari Bajpayee. In 2004, a new government headed by Manmohan Singh was formed at the Centre. This government separated the office of NSA into foreign headed by former Foreign Secretary J.N. Dixit and internal headed by former Director, IB M.K. Narayanan. After the death of Dixit in 2005, the office was again fused and Narayanan became the full-time NSA. He was then succeeded by former Foreign Secretary Shivshankar Menon in 2010. In 2014, the Modi-led government appointed former Director, IB Ajit Doval as the NSA.

Role
The post has high vested powers, so the NSA is a highly prominent and powerful office in the Government of India. All NSAs appointed since the inception of the post in 1998 belong to the either Indian Foreign Service or to the Indian Police Service, and serve at the discretion of the Prime Minister of India.

The National Security Advisor (NSA) is tasked with regularly advising the Prime Minister of India on all matters relating to internal and external threats and opportunities to India, and oversees strategic and sensitive issues on behalf of the Prime Minister. The NSA of India also serves as the Prime Minister's Special Interlocutor with China as well as the envoy to Pakistan and Israel on security affairs.

The NSA receives all intelligence (R&AW, IB, NTRO, MI, DIA, NIA) reports and co-ordinates them to present before the Prime Minister. NSA is assisted by the Deputy National Security Advisors (Deputy NSAs). Currently, retired IPS officer Dattatray Padsalgikar, former R&AW chief Rajinder Khanna and retired IFS officer Pankaj Saran serve as Deputy National Security Advisors. The policy group is the main mechanism for inter-ministerial coordination and integration of inputs in forming national security policies. The group members include the NITI Aayog vice chairman, the cabinet secretary, the three military chiefs, the Reserve Bank of India governor, the foreign secretary, home secretary, finance secretary and the defense secretary.

In June, 2019 NSA Ajit Doval was elevated to the rank of Cabinet Minister with a second 5 year term.

List of National Security Advisors

See also

 National Security Council

Notes

References

Indian government officials
1999 establishments in India